is a flatland-hilltop Japanese castle ruin located in Tokorozawa, Saitama Prefecture. It was on a key route between the northern Kanto Plain and Hachioji.

The most recent structure was built in the 15th century by Ōishi Sadahisa and existed during the 16th-century Sengoku period of Japanese history. In 1546, the Hojo of Odawara took control and in 1569 possession passed to the Takeda. Then  Go-Hōjō clan expanded and improved the defences of the castle.

After 1590, the castle was abandoned simultaneously with the arrival of Tokugawa Ieyasu into the region, having outlived its purpose.

The castle is now a ruin, with clear archeological evidence of the foundations of a number buildings and a dry moat.  The castle name "Taki-no-jō", which literally means "waterfall castle", is due to a waterfall that exists on the eastern part of the castle grounds. The castle grounds now form a recreational park including walking paths, a children's play area and a baseball field. The park is called .

Notes

References 

 Papinot, E. (1910). "Historical and Geographical Dictionary of Japan." 1972 Printing. Charles E. Tuttle Company, Tokyo, .
 On site descriptive signage.

Castles in Saitama Prefecture
Former castles in Japan
Ruined castles in Japan
Go-Hōjō clan